Noel Burnet (4 March 1904 – 24 June 1953) was an Australian environmentalist and founder of the Koala Park Sanctuary, a privately owned and run wildlife park located at West Pennant Hills, New South Wales, Australia. He was a Fellow of the Royal Zoological Society of New South Wales.

Biography
Burnet was born in Sydney, the first of three children of Kathleen (née Bradley) and Charles Alfred Burnet. He attended Newington College, commencing in 1916, under the headmastership of the Rev Dr Charles Prescott.  In the early 1920s, Burnet was living in Brisbane when he first came into contact with koalas. He was a resident of a boarding-house when he was given his first pair of koalas and he placed them on a tree in the garden. Fortunately, the tree was of the right species upon which the koalas thrived. After moving back to Sydney he established Koala Park later in the decade and in 1929 he married Emily Lucas. In 1930 he opened the Koala Park Sanctuary to the public. On his death he was survived by his wife, three sons and a daughter, who carried on the management of the Koala Park Sanctuary.

Publications
The native bear book of Australia (Sydney : W.A. Pepperday & Co, 1934.)
Some Australian fauna (Sydney : W.A. Pepperday & Co., 1932.)
The Bluegum family at Koala Park (Sydney : W.A. Pepperday & Co., 1932.)

References 

1904 births
1953 deaths
People educated at Newington College
20th-century Australian non-fiction writers
Australian conservationists
People from Sydney
Zoo directors
Zoo owners